Wayne Paul Connolly is an Australian musician, record producer and audio engineer. From 1991 to 1997 Connolly provided lead guitar and vocals in guitar pop group the Welcome Mat, with whom he released two studio albums. In 1994, he formed Knievel with Tracy Ellis and Nick Kennedy, which issued four studio albums. Knievel achieved high rotation on national youth radio Triple J, they toured locally and internationally, and supported performances by Luna, Teenage Fanclub, Death Cab for Cutie and The Pernice Brothers.

Career

Musician 

Wayne Connolly (ex-Deluge), on lead guitar and backing vocals, joined urban and western band John Kennedy's Love Gone Wrong in Sydney in mid-1986. Alongside Connolly, the group's line-up was Kennedy on lead vocals and guitar, Cory Messenger on guitar and backing vocals, Barry Turnbull on bass guitar and Vincent Sheehan on drums. They toured Australia in support of their earlier single, "Big Country". Kennedy noticed that there was some resistance from the country music industry in accepting alternative country bands.

With Connolly aboard the line-up released a Christmas single, their cover version of "Run Rudolph Run", in November 1986. Michael Armiger replaced Turnball on bass guitar early in the next year. The band followed with another single, "The Singing City" (October 1987) and its parent album, Always the Bridegroom (December). The album's second single, "World Upside Down", appeared in May 1988, before the group disbanded late that year. During 1989 Connolly performed on Triple M Sydney's comedy radio show, Club Veg with Vic Davies, Dieter Kleeman, Malcolm Lees, John Parsons and Stephen Quinn.

Connolly and Messenger formed the Welcome Mat as an indie rock quartet in 1990 with Pete Bennett on drums (ex-Fiction Romance) and Dave Moss on bass guitar. Leo Mullins (of Benedicts) replaced Moss on bass guitar in May 1991. They released two albums Gram (1993) and Lap of Honour (1996) before disbanding in 1997. Australian musicologist, Ian McFarlane, described their development, "[they] started out as a chirpy, jangly guitar pop outfit before heading in a tougher, though still melodic and harmony-laced, power pop direction."

In 1994 Connolly, while still with the Welcome Mat, formed a guitar pop trio Knievel on lead guitar, keyboards and vocals with Tracy Ellis on bass guitar and Nick Kennedy on drums (ex-Templebeats). The group have issued four studio albums, We Fear Change (1995), Steep Hill Climb (1997), The Name Rings a Bell That Drowns out Your Voice (2000) and Emerald City (2012).

Production and audio engineering

Connolly has balanced his career as a performer with work as a producer and engineer for some of Australia's most successful and respected artists, including Josh Pyke, The Vines, Boy & Bear, Paul Dempsey, Youth Group and You Am I.

In the early 1990s he took a job managing Paradise Studios for rooART, which put him in touch with emerging artists providing songs for the Youngblood compilation series. Among these were Underground Lovers, Glide, and Custard, all of whom formed working relationships with the producer. Production credits from the 1990s include Wahooti Fandango by Custard, Fill Yourself With Music by Screamfeeder, The Young Need Discipline, Lazy Highways and Future Spa by The Fauves, In Your Bright Ray by The Go-Betweens' Grant McLennan, and Sold by Died Pretty.

Since the early 2000s, Connolly has also worked with Neil Finn, Cloud Control, Dallas Crane, Sarah Blasko, Silverchair, Jimmy Barnes, The Living End, Grinspoon, Powderfinger, The Veronicas, Midnight Oil's Jim Moginie, Halfway, Dappled Cities, Old Man River, The Grates, Turnstyle and many more. Recent credits include albums for The Apartments, Community Radio, All Our Exes Live in Texas, Husky, Hungry Kids of Hungary, Knievel, Sounds Like Sunset and The Paper Kites.

Film and television

In addition to his work in the music recording industry, Connolly has produced work for film and television. His credits include Friday On My Mind, The Kettering Incident, Love Child, The Black Balloon, Newcastle, Little Fish, Monkey Puzzle, Mullet, Willful and Dirty Deeds. The track, "When We Get There", produced for The Black Balloon, won best song at the 2008 AGSC/APRA awards.

Studio

From 2007 to 2015, Connolly worked largely from his own studio within the Albert Music premises in Sydney where he housed his restored Neve 8026 desk.

Selected production works

Credits:
1991:
Holler by Billy Baxter
Hoon by Benedicts
Youngblood 3 by Various Artists
1992:
Gastanked (EP) by Custard
Leaves Me Blind by Underground Lovers
Pendulum (EP) by Splash
1993:
Copralalia by You Am I
Promenade by Underground Lovers
Sound as Ever by You Am I
1994:
Wahooti Fandango by Custard
The Young Need Discipline by the Fauves
1995:
Hi Fi Way by You Am I (selected tracks)
Higher Up the Firetrails by Bluebottle Kiss
Sold by Died Pretty
1996:
Hourly Daily by You Am I
Deeper (EP) by Died Pretty
Disappear Here by Glide
Future Spa by The Fauves
1997:
In Your Bright Ray by Grant McLennan
Radio City (EP) by Jericho
Steep Hill Climb by Knievel
1998:
Lazy Highways by the Fauves
Mud and Five Ways to Serve It by Flanders
Using My Gills as a Roadmap by Died Pretty
1999:
Sweeter than the Radio by Icecream Hands
Life in General... by P76
King Autumn by Hoolahan
2000:
Everydaydream by Died Pretty
The Name Rings a Bell that Drowns out your Voice by Knievel
2001:
Size of the Ocean by Big Heavy Stuff
First Translated in 1965 by Ides of Space
Griffith Sunset EP by Evan Dando
2002:
Drag (EP) by Drag
We Got This! by New Christs
2003:
Rarities by Silverchair
2004:
Dallas Crane by Dallas Crane
Skeleton Jar by Youth Group
The Truth About Love by David McCormack & The Polaroids
Dear Friends and Enemies by Big Heavy Stuff
 Farewell to the Fainthearted by Halfway
2006:
Factory Girls by Dallas Crane
Casino Twilight Dogs by Youth Group
Vision Valley by The Vines
Nervous Flashlights by The Fauves
Flame Trees by Sarah Blasko
Remember The River by Halfway
2007:
Intermission: The Best of the Solo Recordings 1990–1997 by Robert Forster and Grant McLennan
The Bells Line by 78 Saab
Memories & Dust by Josh Pyke
2008:
When Good Times Go Good by The Fauves
Chimney's Afire by Josh Pyke
Easy Fever: A Tribute to the Easybeats and Stevie Wright by Various Artists (including Neil Finn, Jimmy Barnes and Iva Davies)
2009:
Zounds by Dappled Cities
Everything is True by Paul Dempsey
Ragged and Ecstatic (select tracks) by Yves Klein Blue
2010:
An Outpost of Promise by Halfway
2012:
Taken for a Fool by Bears with Guns
Young North by The Paper Kites
Serious Magic by Community Radio
Emerald City/Through the Rainbow Dark by Knievel
2013:
Harlequin Dream by Boy & Bear
You're A Shadow by Hungry Kids of Hungary
States by The Paper Kites
Lemons by Woodlock
2014:
Labour of Love by Woodlock
Loneliness by Karise Eden
Echoes in the Aviary by Jane Tyrell
Broken Lines by Patrick James
We Could Leave Tonight by Sounds Like Sunset
2015:
Baby Blue by Noire
No Song, No Spell, No Madrigal by The Apartments
2016:
Look Now You're Cursed by Community Radio
Holograms by Why We Run
2017:
When We Fall by All Our Exes Live in Texas
Zone by Cloud Control
2018:
Jim Salmon's Lament by Perry Keyes
The Narrow Corner by Tim Hart
2019:
Data Dust by Ella Hooper

Awards and nominations

In 1992, Connolly produced the Underground Lovers album, Leaves Me Blind, and subsequently received Rolling Stone magazine's Best Australian Record award. The following year he engineered You Am I's fourth EP Coprolalia and their debut album Sound As Ever, alongside Lee Ranaldo of Sonic Youth. This album went on to win the 1993 ARIA for Best Alternative Release. He has received numerous ARIA nominations and awards for his work, including Producer of the Year for his work on Josh Pyke's Memories and Dust in 2007, and Engineer of the Year for his work on Paul Dempsey's "Fast Friends" in 2010.

1996 – ARIA Engineer of the Year for You Am I, Hourly Daily
2007 – ARIA Engineer of the Year for Josh Pyke, Memories and Dust
2007 – ARIA Award for Producer of the Year for Josh Pyke, Memories and Dust
2010 – ARIA Engineer of the Year for Paul Dempsey, "Fast Friends"

Nominations

2006 – ARIA Producer of the Year for Youth Group, Casino Twilight Dogs
2006 – ARIA Engineer of the Year for The Vines, Vision Valley
2009 – ARIA Producer of the Year for Paul Dempsey, "Everything is True"

See also

Flo Chase, French-born singer-songwriter, musician, and model from Australia

References

External links

 
 Alberts Music
 Knievel's Facebook page

ARIA Award winners
Australian musicians
Year of birth missing (living people)
Living people